Zelmar García (born 2 March 1987) is an Argentine professional footballer who plays as a left-back.

Career
García played in Vélez Sarsfield's youth. Deportivo Merlo were García's first senior club. He scored one goal in twenty-one fixtures in 2008–09 in Primera B Metropolitana, as the club won promotion via the play-offs. In 2009, Godoy Cruz of the Primera División signed García. His first appearance came in a win over Atlético Tucumán on 12 March 2010, which was the first of nine appearances in 2009–10. He remained for two more seasons, as he also scored his first goal in April 2011 during a win at the Estadio Monumental Antonio Vespucio Liberti against River Plate. García had a 2012–13 stint with Quilmes but didn't play.

In January 2014, García completed a move to Primera B Nacional's Brown. His first season concluded with relegation to tier three, as he appeared seven times under Pablo Vicó. García remained for the 2014 Primera B Metropolitana, prior to departing to Chacarita Juniors on 9 January 2015. Thirteen appearances followed across seven months, before he rejoined Deportivo Merlo on loan in July. The club were soon relegated, though García stayed for two seasons in Primera C Metropolitana. 2017 saw García join Colegiales. He made his bow against Tristán Suárez, with goal one following versus Barracas Central.

Career statistics
.

References

External links

1987 births
Living people
Sportspeople from Buenos Aires Province
Argentine footballers
Association football defenders
Primera B Metropolitana players
Argentine Primera División players
Primera Nacional players
Primera C Metropolitana players
Deportivo Merlo footballers
Godoy Cruz Antonio Tomba footballers
Quilmes Atlético Club footballers
Club Atlético Brown footballers
Chacarita Juniors footballers
Club Atlético Colegiales (Argentina) players
Argentino de Quilmes players